Artvoice is an American web based publication covering arts, business, and general editorial news nationally and internationally. Artvoice began in Buffalo, New York, in 1990 as a free weekly print publication with a 65,000 circulation. Artvoice covered arts, theater, music,  food, sports, politics, urban development and environmental issues in the Buffalo region. Artvoice first published content online in 1996. It was founded by Jamie Moses in 1990. It had an ownership change in 2015. In 2010, Artvoice celebrated its 20th anniversary in its June edition with a time frame of the history of the publication. It also celebrated its 25th anniversary in 2015 with a party celebrating performing and visual arts. The 2015 change in ownership also signaled a change in the editorial direction of the newspaper.

Artvoice releases its content at its website, Artvoice.com. For many years, it was the only professional print competition to The Buffalo News distributed throughout the Buffalo metropolitan area. For 26 years Artvoice hosted the "Arties" Awards, an event created by its theater editor Anthony Chase to celebrate excellence in local theater and to raise funds for AIDS organizations. Along with the Arties, the Give For Greatness campaign, and other Artvoice events, the paper raised and donated over $1 million to local charities. The Arties theater awards ceremony moved to the public NPR stations WNED/WBFO in 2017 but still retains the title "The Arties". Artvoice also ran an annual "Best of Buffalo" competition where readers were able to nominate and vote for their favorite individuals, groups, or companies in dozens of categories including food, people, theater, fine art, and retail.

In 2014, many of the staff of Artvoice, including Editor Geoff Kelly, left Artvoice to launch a competing weekly newspaper, The Public. For nearly three years, both publications competed and existed side-by-side. The Public ceased printing in April 2019. In 2015, Artvoice merged ownership with the Niagara Falls Reporter.  The papers combined certain business services editorial control. In May 2017, Artvoice ceased their print publication to focus on national and world news and arts. Among the columnists associated with Artvoice are educator, Dr. John O. Hunter, Frank Dux and convicted felon Roger Stone. Frank Parlato,a convicted felon, is publisher and editor in chief.

Coverage of NXIVM Scandal 
In 2017, Artvoice made national headlines for its reporting on the NXIVM scandal. Its coverage of the scandal has been hailed as instrumental in informing both the public and authorities about the cult's activities, which included a number of sex and financial crimes.
The HBO miniseries The Vow, released in 2020, prominently features Artvoice editor in chief Frank Parlato.

References

External links 

Newspapers published in Buffalo, New York
Alternative weekly newspapers published in the United States
1990 establishments in New York (state)
Publications established in 1990